Baghan (also Romanized as Bāghān) is a village in Baghan Rural District, Mahmeleh District, Khonj County, Fars Province, Iran. At the 2006 census, its population was 717, in 135 families.

References 

Populated places in Khonj County